Harvey Campbell (September 30, 1792 – September 16, 1877) was an American physician and politician.

Campbell was the son of Dr. Allen and Sarah (Kinne) Campbell, and was born in Voluntown, Connecticut, September 30, 1792.  He studied medicine with his father (long a successful physician in Eastern Connecticut) and afterwards in Yale Medical School, where he graduated in 1816.  He settled in his native town and enjoyed a large practice. He was also interested in public affairs, and repeatedly a member of both houses of the Connecticut General Assembly.
 
He married Sarah Cook, and after her death her sister, Eliza Cook, who also died before him.  He died in Groton, Connecticut, September 16, 1877, at the age of 85.  He left two sons and six daughters.

References

External links

1792 births
1877 deaths
People from New London County, Connecticut
Members of the Connecticut House of Representatives
Connecticut state senators
Physicians from Connecticut
Yale School of Medicine alumni
19th-century American politicians